Fitzroy Point is a low point at the east side of Fliess Bay forming the northeast extremity of Joinville Island, off Graham Land, Antarctica. It was discovered on 30 December 1842 by a British expedition under James Clark Ross, who named it "Cape Fitzroy" for Captain (later Vice Admiral) Robert FitzRoy, Royal Navy, an English hydrographer and meteorologist.

References 

Headlands of the Joinville Island group